Namangan Region (/Наманган вилояти, نەمەنگەن ۋىلايەتى; , Namanganskaya oblast) is one of the regions of Uzbekistan, located in the southern part of the Fergana Valley in far eastern part of the country. It is on the right bank of Syr Darya River and borders with Kyrgyzstan, Tajikistan, Tashkent Region, Fergana Region, and Andijan Region. It covers an area of 7,440 km2. The population is estimated to be 2,931,056 (2022), with 35% of the population living in rural areas. The great river Syrdarya, the main waterway in Central Asia, starts in the territory of Namangan. Syrdarya is formed from inflows of the rivers Naryn and Kara Darya. The Namangan region is very rich in various natural resources. In particular, the region extracts oil in Mingbulak District and big gold and diamond deposits have been discovered in Kosonsoy and Pop Districts. There are also large deposits of uranium, silver, aluminum, tungsten, iron, copper, granite, and marble, among others. There are two big mountain tunnels connecting the Fergana valley with the inner city area and other regions of the country, located in the territory of Namangan.

Districts

The Namangan Region consists of 11 districts (listed below) and one district-level city: Namangan.

There are 8 cities (Namangan, Kosonsoy, Haqqulobod, Pop, Toʻraqoʻrgʻon, Yangi Namangan,Uchqoʻrgʻon, Chortoq, Chust) and 115 urban-type settlements in the Namangan Region.

Geography

The climate is a typically continental climate with extreme differences between winter and summer temperatures.

Natural resources include deposits of petroleum, natural gas, gold, lead, copper, quartz and antimony. Main agriculture includes cotton, horticulture and sericulture, animal husbandry, including breeding of Angora goats for their valuable down hair.

Industry is primarily based on textiles, with two large silk production complexes, a non-woven fabric manufacturing plant, cotton yarn processing, and numerous smaller textile, leather and footwear plants. The area is also a center for the production of traditional Uzbek handicrafts, especially knives.

Economy
By the first half of 2014, gross regional product of Namangan region has comprised  2,214 billion soum, which is a 9.8% increase comparing to the same period in 2013. In fact, industry has grown 13%, agriculture – 7.6%, construction – 5.7%, trade – 13.6%, services – 16%.

The major spheres of agricultural are cotton, cereals, fruits and vegetables, as well as livestock production.  Textile, food processing, machinery, and building materials production are prevailing in the regional industry. 

There are engineering plants, automotive repair shops, chemical plants, as well as cotton yarn, silk, and leather productions, developed handicrafts, and several companies with foreign capital in Namangan region. There are such foreign capital (Korean, Russian, Chinese, American, Vietnamese, Pakistani, Turkish etc.) companies as Uzbek-Swiss joint venture (JV) «Nestle-Uzbekistan» producing baby food, Uzbek-Korean JV «Uzchasis» producing car headlights and street lights, Korean enterprise «Hayn Tex» producing textile, Uzbek-American JV «Mushtariy International LTD» producing clothing and others.

As of July 2014, foreign trade turnover of Namangan region comprised US$136 million, which is a 10.8% increase comparing to the same period in previous year. Export has grown 13.6%, and import – 3.4%.   Export is dominated by cotton (42.8%), consumer goods (18.9%), services (5.2%) and others, where as import is represented by equipment and machinery (35.5%), consumer goods (17.1%), chemical production (23%) and other.

Education
There are 690 schools, 10 academic lyceums, 108 colleges in Namangan region. Moreover, there are three higher education institutions in Namangan city — Namangan State University, Namangan Engineering Pedagogical Institute, and Namangan Engineering Technological Institute. Namangan State University is the largest, oldest and highest ranked of the three.

History and sightseeing
Namangan region plays an important role in the centuries-old history of Uzbekistan, especially at the time of Independence. 

There are historical and holy places in the region: Mulla Kirgiz mosque (1910), Ota Valikhon tura and Sheykh Iskhok Eshon mosques, Hasrati mavlono Lutfullokh Chustiy complex, Mulla Bozor Okhund mausoleum, as well as such holy places as Baliqlik Mozor, Buloqdi Mozor, and Bibi Ona. These objects are protected by the government. The Namangan region is widely known for its gardens and it is also famous for a national dress made of "Beqasam" material, a type of silk called atlas and Chust knives, embroidered skull-caps, as well as the curative waters of its sanatoria and resorts, the most popular resort being in the city of Chartak.

References

  Uzbekistan CIA – The World Factbook

External links
Official site of Namangan Region .

 
Regions of Uzbekistan